Combat Logistics Battalion 1 (CLB 1) is a logistics battalion of the United States Marine Corps. They are part of Combat Logistics Regiment 1 and the 1st Marine Logistics Group. The unit is based out of the Marine Corps Base Camp Pendleton, California.

Mission
To provide logistics support to Regimental Combat Team 1 (RCT-1) beyond its organic capabilities in any environment and throughout the spectrum of conflict in order to allow RCT-1 to continue operations independent of any logistically driven operational pauses.

Subordinate units
 * Headquarters & Service Company
 Transportation Services Company

History

From October 2009 through May 2010, CLB-1 deployed to Afghanistan in support of Operation Enduring Freedom. The battalion provided tactical logistics support to Regimental Combat Team 7 during Operation Moshtarak in February 2010, where Marines fought to secure the former Taliban stronghold of Marjah. During the deployment they were also responsible for transportation of supplies to ground units through combat logistics patrols, air delivery and helicopter support teams; improving roads and trafficability for units moving throughout Helmand Province; and maintaining vehicles and equipment that constantly took a beating in the dust-covered rocky Afghanistan terrain.

See also

 List of United States Marine Corps battalions
 Organization of the United States Marine Corps

References
Notes

Web

 CLB-1's official website
 Website for parents of CLB-1 Marines

CLB1